The public service of Ireland refers to the entirety of public administration within the state government apparatus. The Department of Public Expenditure, National Development Plan Delivery and Reform defines the Irish public service as consisting of:
 Civil Service 
 Defence sector
 Education sector 
 Justice sector
 Health sector 
 Local authorities 
 Non-Commercial State Agencies or NCSA.
 Non-Commercial State Agencies or NCSA.
Two-thirds of the public service is in the health and education sectors (doctors, nurses, healthcare assistants (HCAs), consultants, teachers, classroom assistants, etc.).

Civil service

The Civil Service of Ireland is the collective term for the permanent staff of the departments of state and certain state agencies who advise and work for the Government of Ireland. It consists of two broad components, the Civil Service of the Government and the Civil Service of the State. Whilst these two components are largely theoretical they do have some fundamental operational differences.

The Civil Service of the Government 
The Civil Service of the Government advises and carries out the work of the Government, through the various Departments of State, of which there are fifteen; one for each Minister of the Government. Each department is led by a senior civil servant known as the Secretary General (often referred to as "departmental head" in the media), a title equivalent to that of Permanent Secretary in the British Civil Service. The most senior civil servant and head of the civil service is the Secretary General to the Government, currently Martin Fraser. The Secretary General to the Government is a dual-hatted position as they also head up the Department of the Taoiseach, a government department analogous to a cabinet office in other countries.

The Civil Service of the State 
The Civil Service of the State however is a relatively small component of the overall civil service, and its members are expected to be absolutely independent of the government, in addition to normal political independence which is expected. The Civil Service of the State typically comprises specialised agencies such as the Revenue Commissioners, Central Statistics Office, Office of Public Works, Comptroller and Auditor-General of Ireland, Courts Service of Ireland, Director of Public Prosecutions, Legal Aid Board and Prisons Service are all considered to be part of the Civil Service of the State, as opposed to being non-commercial semi-state bodies like Fáilte Ireland and IDA Ireland. Other offices are also prescribed under the Civil Service of the State.

The largest reform of the civil service occurred in 1984 when the abolition of the Department of Posts and Telegraphs led to the halving of civil service numbers. The affected personnel, mainly postal and telecommunications workers, were transferred to An Post and Telecom Éireann respectively. Today there are approximately 37,523 people employed in the national civil service.

Defence sector

The defence sector refers to the total number of personnel of the Irish Defence Forces, which consists of the Irish Army, Naval Service and Air Corps. Personnel numbers for each of the three services is as follows:

 Irish Army: 7,821
 Naval Service: 1,084
 Air Corps: 748

State spending on defence totalled €895 million for 2016.

Education sector

The education sector represents the second largest sector of the Irish public service, with 96,432 employees working in primary, post-primary and third level institutes. A break-down of numbers is as follows:

 Primary schools: 44,595
 Post-Primary: 34,470
 Third-Level: 17,367, the majority of which are in universities (9,991) and Institutes of Technology (7,249).

Public spending in 2016 on education totalled just over €8.3 billion.

Health sector

The health sector in Ireland makes up the largest part of the Irish public service, with a total staff of 105,885. Health makes up 35% of the total number of workers in the national public service. The Health Service Executive is the largest component of Ireland's health sector, with 67,145 employed as part of it.

 Health Service Executive: 67,145
 Voluntary Agencies (Non Acute): 14,914
 Voluntary Hospitals: 23,825

Spending in the health sector totalled just over €13.6 billion in 2016.

Justice sector
The justice sector refers to policing in Ireland, specifically the Garda Síochána, which has a workforce, not counting civilian staff of 13,261. Spending on policing amounted to €1.4 billion in 2016.

Local Authorities

Local government in Ireland is undertaken by 31 local authorities, each one corresponding to a city or county. Employees of local authorities are considered to be part of the Irish public service, with funding for local government provided mainly by central government, as well the local property tax. There are approximately 27,188 employed for the 31 local authorities across Ireland, with Dublin City Council with the largest employee count of all the councils with 5,330 staff.

Non-commercial state agencies

Non-commercial state agencies, or government agencies are autonomously run state agencies assigned with a specific task, and typically free to carry out their responsibilities free of government or ministerial interference. State agencies are, for the most part, established through legislation by the Dáil and overseen by the relevant committee of the Oireachtas. Examples of such state agencies include the Arts Council, Bord Iascaigh Mhara, Health Information and Quality Authority, Higher Education Authority and Transport Infrastructure Ireland

In 2016 there were 12,616 employed in various Non-commercial state agencies, with the largest by employee being the Child and Family Agency with 3,554 staff.

Public service numbers

See also
Government of Ireland

External links
Public Appointments Service
Commission for Public Service Appointments
2010 Civil Service salary scales
A Review of the Civil Service Grading and Pay System 2008

References

Government of the Republic of Ireland